Flamberge was a  built for the French Navy around the beginning of the 20th century.

Citations

Bibliography

 

Pertuisane-class destroyers
Ships built in France
1901 ships